Lacus Doloris  (Latin dolōris, "Lake of Sorrow") is a small lunar mare located in the Terra Nivium region at 16.8° N, 8.6° E. It is 103 km in diameter.

References

Doloris